A regional election took place in Poitou-Charentes on March 21 and March 28, 2004, along with all other regions. Ségolène Royal (PS) was elected president, defeating incumbent Élisabeth Morin (UMP).

References

2004
Poitou-Charentes regional election